15 is the two disc "Fifteen Year Anniversary Collection" from Phatfish, released in 2008. It contains 32 songs from the collection of Phatfish albums and EPs spanning back to 1994. The most recent tracks are taken from 2007's Guaranteed.

Track listing
 "Heavenbound"
 "Rise Up"
 "O God of Love"
 "Amazing God"
 "River of Life"
 "What Would I Do?"
 "An Audience with God"
 "Extravagant Praise"
 "Annoy"
 "Awake, Awake O Zion"
 "Soften My Heart"
 "Kingdom Coming"
 "Prayer Song"
 "The Cross"
 "Here Is the Risen Son"
 "Wake Up O Sleeper"
 "Holy, Holy"
 "There is a Day"
 "Best Thing"
 "Castaway"
 "Faithful"
 "Your Love"
 "Walk on By"
 "Mr Happy Fudge"
 "Stepping Out"
 "Resolve"
 "Phathouse"
 "Funkmine"
 "Come to Me"
 "This is What My God Is Like"
 "The Call"
 "From the Rising of the Sun"

References

Phatfish compilation albums
2008 greatest hits albums